Sir Lewis Lougher, JP (1 October 1871 – 28 August 1955) was a Welsh businessman and politician.

He was the second son of Thomas Lougher of Llandaff, and Charlotte née Lewis, daughter of a farmer from Radyr. Following education at Cardiff Secondary School and Cardiff Technical College he was apprenticed to corn merchants. However he quickly established himself in the shipping business at a time when Cardiff Docks were developing as the largest coal-exporting port in the world.

In 1910, at the age of 29, he established his own shipping company, Lewis Lougher & Co. He went on to become  became chairman of several shipping companies in Cardiff, Penarth and Barry. He was also chairman of the Federation of Bristol Channel Shipowners and of the Cardiff Chamber of Trade. He also became a developer of housing, and a director of Whitehouse Precast Concrete Limited, and Danybryn Estates Limited. He was also a director of Ben Evans & Co. Ltd, a Swansea department store.

A Conservative in politics, at the 1922 general election he was elected as Member of Parliament for Cardiff East: he lost the seat when another general election was held in 1923. He returned to parliament at the election in 1924, when he moved to the neighbouring seat of Cardiff Central, holding it until 1929. While in the Commons he successfully introduced a private member's bill that was enacted as the Road Transport Lighting Act 1927.

He was a member of Glamorgan County Council from 1922 to 1949, and also of Cardiff Rural District Council, holding the chairmanship of the latter body for many years. He was a justice of the peace for Glamorgan, was knighted "for political services" in 1929 and in 1931 was High Sheriff of the county.

Lougher never married. He died aged 83 in the home he shared with his sister in Radyr in 1955.

References

External links 
 

1871 births
1955 deaths
UK MPs 1922–1923
UK MPs 1924–1929
Members of the Parliament of the United Kingdom for Cardiff constituencies
People from Llandaff
Welsh businesspeople in shipping
Conservative Party (UK) MPs for Welsh constituencies
Councillors in Wales
Businesspeople from Cardiff
Members of Glamorgan County Council
Welsh justices of the peace
Knights Bachelor